Tyler/Vernon station is a DART Light Rail station in Dallas, Texas. It is located at Tyler Street and Vernon Avenue in the Oak Cliff neighborhood.

Originally there was no DART parking lot at this station (making it one of the few stations with no parking facilities) but a small pay parking lot, nestled between houses in the mainly residential area, was adjacent to the station.  However, this small lot is now part of the station facility and no longer charges for parking.

References

External links
 DART - Tyler/Vernon Station

Dallas Area Rapid Transit light rail stations in Dallas
Railway stations in the United States opened in 1996
1996 establishments in Texas
Railway stations in Dallas County, Texas